The 1970 Pacific Southwest Open – Men's singles was an event of the 1970 Pacific Southwest Open tennis tournament and was played on outdoor hard courts at the Los Angeles Tennis Center in Los Angeles, California in the United States between September 21 and September 27, 1970. Pancho Gonzales  was the defending Pacific Southwest Open champion but was defeated in the quarterfinals. First-seeded Rod Laver won the title by defeating second-seeded John Newcombe 4–6, 6–4, 7–6(7–5) in the final.

Seeds

Draw

Finals

Top half

Section 1

Section 2

Bottom half

Section 3

Section 4

References

External links
 ATP singles draw
 ITF tournament edition details

Los Angeles Open (tennis)
1970 Grand Prix (tennis)
Pacific Southwest Open
Pacific Southwest Open